Robert Martin Strachan (December 1, 1913 – July 21, 1981) was a trade unionist and politician. He was the longest serving Leader of the Opposition in British Columbia history.

Born in Glasgow, Scotland, Strachan was a carpenter by trade. He immigrated to Canada after quitting a 10-shilling-a-week job as messenger boy in Glasgow to go to Nova Scotia on a $10-a-week farm labor scheme. He moved west, in 1931, to the northern B.C. copper-smelting town of Anyox and then to Powell River, where he became a carpenter and an active unionist eventually becoming British Columbia head of the Brotherhood of Carpenters and Joiners of America.

In 1952, he was elected to the British Columbia Legislative Assembly as an MLA for the socialist Co-operative Commonwealth Federation. In 1956, he was elected CCF leader thus becoming Leader of the Opposition to the Social Credit government of W.A.C. Bennett. Strachan's CCF ran in the 1960 general election on the platform of nationalizing the province's private hydro-electric company, B.C. Electric. Bennett denounced the idea during the election campaign but, in 1961, turned around and announced plans to do exactly that in order to create BC Hydro leading Strachan to denounce the Social Credit government as hypocrites.

He remained leader after the party transformed into the British Columbia New Democratic Party in 1961. He defeated a leadership challenge by "Young Turk" Thomas Berger in 1967, but sensing a mood for change he stepped down in 1969.

Strachan remained in the legislature, however, and was appointed Highways Minister when the NDP formed government for the first time as a result of the 1972 general election. He was appointed to the new position of Minister of Transport and Communications in 1973. Strachan oversaw the implementation of the NDP's promise to institute public automobile insurance and was responsible for the creation of the government owned Insurance Corporation of British Columbia. Strachan left politics in 1975 when he was appointed the province's agent general to the United Kingdom by Premier Dave Barrett. He served in the position for almost two years.

He died of lung cancer in 1981.

References

1913 births
1981 deaths
British Columbia Co-operative Commonwealth Federation MLAs
British Columbia New Democratic Party MLAs
Canadian socialists
Canadian trade unionists
Scottish carpenters
Deaths from cancer in British Columbia
Deaths from lung cancer
Leaders of the British Columbia CCF/NDP
British emigrants to Canada
20th-century Canadian politicians
Canadian people of Scottish descent